= Albanian Democratic Union =

Albanian minority party

The Albanian Democratic Union (Albanian: Bashkimi Demokratik Shqiptar, BDSh, Macedonian: Демократска унија на Албанците) is an Albanian minority party in North Macedonia. It was founded in September 2007 by former Kosovo Liberation Army member Bardhyl Mahmuti.
